Qatar University Stadium is a multi-purpose stadium of Qatar University in the Al Tarfa district of Doha, Qatar. It is commonly used for football matches and athletics events of the university. The stadium can host up to 10,000 spectators.

References

Football venues in Qatar
Qatar University